Eduardo Nilton Agra Galvão, commonly known as Eduardo Agra (born 31 July 1956), is a Brazilian former professional basketball player.

Career
During his pro club career, Agra won the 1979 edition of the FIBA Intercontinental Cup, while a member of EC Sírio. With the senior Brazilian national basketball team, Agra competed at the 1978 FIBA World Cup, and the 1984 Summer Olympics.

References

External links
 

1956 births
Living people
Basketball players at the 1984 Summer Olympics
Brazilian men's basketball players
1978 FIBA World Championship players
Clube Atlético Monte Líbano basketball players
Esporte Clube Sírio basketball players
Olympic basketball players of Brazil
Sportspeople from Recife
Small forwards
Sport Club Corinthians Paulista basketball players